Strait Out of the Box is the first box set album by American country music artist George Strait. It contains four albums' worth of music, dating from 1976 to 1995. It mainly consists of Strait's singles, except for a select few that he decided to exclude. They were replaced by his choice of album cuts and several studio outtakes. It also contains his three singles recorded in the 1970s for indie label D Records, one of which, "I Just Can't Go on Dying Like This", was re-recorded for Strait's 2013 album Love Is Everything.

"Check Yes or No" and "I Know She Still Loves Me" were both released from this set as singles. Respectively, they reached number 1 and number 5 on the Billboard country charts.

The album was certified 8× platinum by the RIAA on July 29, 2003, indicating shipment of 2 million copies.
This made the album at the time the best-performing country music box set of all time, and it was second only to the Live 1975–85 box set by Bruce Springsteen and the E Street Band overall. It had sold 1,525,100 copies in the United States as of October 2019.

Track listing

Personnel

 Tim Alexander – piano on "Big Ball's in Cowtown"
 David Anthony – acoustic guitar
 Ron Anthony – acoustic guitar 
 Joe Barnhill – acoustic guitar
 Eddie Bayers – drums
 Richard Bennett – acoustic guitar
 Ray Benson – acoustic guitar and background vocals on "Big Ball's in Cowtown"
 Chuck Berghofer – upright bass
 Matt Betton – drums
 George Binkley III – strings
 Pete Bordonali – electric guitar
 John David Boyle – strings
 Clyde Brooks – drums
 Ronnie Brooks – acoustic guitar
 Larry Byrom – electric guitar
 Sandra Callaway – background vocals
 Buddy Cannon – background vocals
 Jimmy Capps – acoustic guitar
 Jerry Carrigan – drums
 Cindy Cashdollar – steel guitar on "Big Ball's in Cowtown"
 Marcy Cates – background vocals
 Margie Cates – background vocals
 Marvin Chantry – strings
 Steve Chapman – acoustic guitar
 Joe Chemay – bass guitar
 Gene Chrisman – drums
 Roy Christenson – strings
 Virginia Christenson – strings
 Doug Clements – background vocals
 Mike Daily – steel guitar
 Hank DeVito – steel guitar
 Floyd Domino – piano
 Steve Dorff – conductor, string arrangements
 Glen Duncan – fiddle
 Stuart Duncan – fiddle
 Gene Elders – fiddle
 Buddy Emmons – steel guitar
 Mark Feldman – fiddle
 Gregg Field – drums
 Rito Figlio – background vocals
 Phil Fisher – drums
 Pat Flynn – acoustic guitar
 Tom Foote – drums
 Michael Francis – saxophone
 Paul Franklin – steel guitar, dobro
 Gregg Galbraith – acoustic guitar, electric guitar
 Sonny Garrish – dobro, steel guitar
 Bob Golette – drums
 Steve Gibson – acoustic guitar, electric guitar, hi-string acoustic guitar
 Johnny Gimble – fiddle, mandolin
 Emory Gordy Jr. – bass guitar
 Carl Gorodetzky – strings
 Ruben Gosfeld – steel guitar
 Lennie Haight – strings
 Rob Hajacos – fiddle
 Owen Hale – drums
 Terry Hale – bass guitar
 Arlene Harden – background vocals
 Bobby Harden – background vocals
 Hoot Hester – fiddle
 John Hobbs – keyboards
 Jim Horn – saxophone
 Ronnie Huckaby – piano
 Sherilyn Huffman – background vocals
 John Hughey – steel guitar
 Mitch Humphries – keyboards
 David Hungate – bass guitar
 Leo Jackson – acoustic guitar, electric guitar
 John Barlow Jarvis – piano
 Gwen Kay – background vocals
 Dave Kirby – acoustic guitar
 Jerry Kroon – drums
 Mike Leech – bass guitar
 Larrie Londin – drums
 Benny McArthur – electric guitar
 Randy McCormick – piano
 Wade McCurdy – background vocals
 Rick McRae – electric guitar
 Bill Mabry – fiddle
 Liana Manis – background vocals
 Steve Marsh – saxophone
 Brent Mason – acoustic guitar, electric guitar
 Bill Miller – piano
 David Miller – bass guitar on "Big Ball's in Cowtown"
 Dennis Molchan – strings
 Alan Moore – string arrangements 
 Bob Moore – upright bass
 Weldon Myrick – steel guitar
 Nashville String Machine – strings
 Steve Nathan – piano, organ, synthesizer
 Fred Newell – electric guitar
 Jody Nix – background vocals on "Big Ball's in Cowtown"
 Louis Dean Nunley – background vocals
 Mark O'Connor – fiddle
 Gary Van Osdale – strings
 Pamela Van Osdale – strings
 Larry Paxton – bass guitar
 Leon Rhodes – bass guitar
 Hargus "Pig" Robbins – keyboards
 Judy Rodman – background vocals
 Matt Rollings – piano
 Jack Ross – bass guitar
 Brent Rowan – electric guitar
 David Sanger – drums on "Big Ball's in Cowtown"
 Walter Schwede – strings
 Randy Scruggs – acoustic guitar
 Eldon Shamblin – electric guitar on "Big Ball's in Cowtown"
 Donna Sheridan – background vocals
 Jerry Shook – acoustic guitar
 Frank Sinatra – vocals on "Fly Me to the Moon"
 Leland Sklar – bass guitar
 Buddy Spicher – fiddle
 Harry Stinson – background vocals
 George Strait – acoustic guitar, lead vocals, background vocals
 Henry Strzelecki – bass guitar
 Donald Teal – strings
 Bobby Thompson – acoustic guitar 
 Hank Thompson – vocals on "Six Pack to Go"
 Diane Tidwell – background vocals
 Ricky Turpin – fiddle and mandolin on "Big Ball's in Cowtown"
 Billy Joe Walker Jr. – electric guitar
 Jamie Whiting – keyboards
 Patrick Williams – conductor
 Bobby Wood – keyboards
 Stephanie Woolf – strings
 Glenn Worf – bass guitar
 Paul Yandell – acoustic guitar, electric guitar
 Chip Young – electric guitar
 Curtis Young – background vocals
 Reggie Young – electric guitar
 Andrea Zonn – background vocals

Charts

Weekly charts

Year-end charts

References

External links
George Strait official website album page
[ Allmusic album main page]

1995 compilation albums
George Strait compilation albums
MCA Records compilation albums
Albums produced by Phil Ramone
Albums produced by Tony Brown (record producer)
Albums produced by Jimmy Bowen
Albums produced by Ray Baker (music producer)